Peroxisome proliferator-activated receptor alpha (PPAR-α), also known as NR1C1 (nuclear receptor subfamily 1, group C, member 1), is a nuclear receptor protein functioning as a transcription factor that in humans is encoded by the PPARA gene. Together with peroxisome proliferator-activated receptor delta and peroxisome proliferator-activated receptor gamma, PPAR-alpha is part of the subfamily of peroxisome proliferator-activated receptors. It was the first member of the PPAR family to be cloned in 1990 by Stephen Green and has been identified as the nuclear receptor for a diverse class of rodent hepatocarcinogens that causes proliferation of peroxisomes.

Expression 
PPAR-α is primarily activated through ligand binding. Endogenous ligands include fatty acids such as arachidonic acid as well as other polyunsaturated fatty acids and various fatty acid-derived compounds such as certain members of the 15-hydroxyeicosatetraenoic acid family of arachidonic acid metabolites, e.g. 15(S)-HETE, 15(R)-HETE, and 15(S)-HpETE and 13-hydroxyoctadecadienoic acid, a linoleic acid metabolite. Synthetic ligands include the fibrate drugs, which are used to treat hyperlipidemia, and a diverse set of insecticides, herbicides, plasticizers, and organic solvents collectively referred to as peroxisome proliferators.

Function 

PPAR-α is a transcription factor regulated by free fatty acids, and is a major regulator of lipid metabolism in the liver. PPAR-alpha is activated under  conditions of energy deprivation and is necessary for the process of ketogenesis, a key adaptive response to prolonged fasting. Activation of PPAR-alpha promotes uptake, utilization, and catabolism of fatty acids by upregulation of genes involved in fatty acid transport, fatty acid binding and activation, and peroxisomal and mitochondrial fatty acid β-oxidation. Activation of fatty acid oxidation is facilitated by increased expression of CPR1 (which brings long-chain lipids into mitochondria) by PPAR-α. PPAR-α also inhibits glycolysis, while promoting liver gluconeogenesis and glycogen synthesis.

In macrophages, PPAR-α inhibits the uptake of glycated low-density lipoprotein (LDL cholesterol), inhibits foam cell (atherosclerosis) formation, and inhibits pro-inflammatory cytokines.

Tissue distribution 

Expression of PPAR-α is highest in tissues that oxidize fatty acids at a rapid rate. In rodents, highest mRNA expression levels of PPAR-alpha are found in liver and brown adipose tissue, followed by heart and kidney. Lower PPAR-alpha expression levels are found in small and large intestine, skeletal muscle and adrenal gland. Human PPAR-alpha seems to be expressed more equally among various tissues, with high expression in liver, intestine, heart, and kidney.

Knockout studies 

Studies using mice lacking functional PPAR-alpha indicate that PPAR-α is essential for induction of peroxisome proliferation by a diverse set of synthetic compounds referred to as peroxisome proliferators. Mice lacking PPAR-alpha also have an impaired response to fasting, characterized by major metabolic perturbations including low plasma levels of ketone bodies, hypoglycemia, and fatty liver.

Pharmacology 

PPAR-α is the pharmaceutical target of fibrates, a class of drugs used in the treatment of dyslipidemia. Fibrates effectively lower serum triglycerides and raises serum HDL-cholesterol levels. Although clinical benefits of fibrate treatment have been observed, the overall results are mixed and have led to reservations about the broad application of fibrates for the treatment of coronary heart disease, in contrast to statins. PPAR-α, agonists may carry therapeutic value for the treatment of non-alcoholic fatty liver disease.  PPAR-alpha may also be a site of action of certain anticonvulsants.

An endogenous compound, 7(S)-Hydroxydocosahexaenoic Acid (7(S)-HDHA/), which is a Docosanoid derivative of the omega-3 fatty acid DHA was isolated as an endogenous high affinity ligand for PPAR-alpha in the rat and mouse brain. The 7(S) enantiomer bound with micromolar affity to PPAR alpha with 10 fold higher affinity compared to the (R) enantiomer and could trigger dendritic activation.
Previous evidence for the compound's function was speculative based on the structure and study of the chemical synthesis.

Both high sugar and low protein diets elevate the circulating liver hormone FGF21 in humans by means of PPAR-α, although this effect can be accompanied by FGF21-resistance.

Target genes 

PPAR-α governs biological processes by altering the expression of a large number of target genes. Accordingly, the functional role of PPAR-alpha is directly related to the biological function of its target genes. Gene expression profiling studies have indicated that PPAR-alpha target genes number in the hundreds.  Classical target genes of PPAR-alpha include PDK4, ACOX1, and CPT1. Low and high throughput gene expression analysis have allowed the creation of comprehensive maps illustrating the role of PPAR-alpha as master regulator of lipid metabolism via regulation of numerous genes involved in various aspects of lipid metabolism. These maps, constructed for mouse liver and human liver, put PPAR-alpha at the center of a regulatory hub impacting fatty acid uptake and intracellular binding, mitochondrial β-oxidation and peroxisomal fatty acid oxidation, ketogenesis, triglyceride turnover, gluconeogenesis, and bile synthesis/secretion.

Interactions 

PPAR-α has been shown to interact with:
 AIP,
 EP300
 HSP90AA1,
 NCOA1, and
 NCOR1.
Palmitoylethanolamide (PEA)
Oleoylethanolamide (OEA)
Anandamide (AEA)
 7( S)-Hydroxydocosahexaenoic Acid (7-HDoHE)
 PFAS

See also 
 Peroxisome proliferator-activated receptor
 Fibrate
Endocannabinoid system

References

Further reading 

 
 
 
 
 
 
 
 
 
 
 
 
 
 
 
 
 
 
 
 

Intracellular receptors
Transcription factors